S.S.C. Napoli had its best league season in five years, finishing third in the 1985–86 league season. Due to Roma's collapse in the final rounds of the season, Napoli closed to within two points of second place, also having a significant margin to Torino in fourth. Diego Maradona prepared for his glorious World Cup with eleven goals and several assists.

Squad

Transfers

Competitions

Serie A

League table

Results by round

Matches

Topscorers
  Diego Maradona 11
  Bruno Giordano 10
  Daniel Bertoni 3

Coppa Italia

First round

Statistics

Players statistics

References

S.S.C. Napoli seasons
Napoli